Farahia Teuiria (born 29 August 1972) in Tahiti is a footballer who plays as a midfielder. He previously played for AS Vaiete. He currently plays for AS Tiaré in the Tahiti Division Fédérale and the Tahiti national football team.

References

1972 births
Living people
French Polynesian footballers
Tahiti international footballers
Association football midfielders
2004 OFC Nations Cup players